is a railway station in Rankoshi, Isoya District, Hokkaidō, Japan.

Lines
Hokkaido Railway Company
Hakodate Main Line Station S28

Adjacent stations

Railway stations in Hokkaido Prefecture
Railway stations in Japan opened in 1904
Rankoshi, Hokkaido